Dr. Dirk-Achim Pajonk (born March 27, 1969) is a German physician and former athlete.

Career 
Dirk Pajonk was eleven years a member of the German national team in the decathlon and started 04 for the TSV Bayer Leverkusen. In 1996 he took part in the Olympic Games in Atlanta, and in 1998 he became a German champion in the decathlon. In the same year he completed his medical studies. He is now attending physician of the German decathlon and Anti-Doping Commissioner of the German decathlete. As of 2004, Pajonk is an orthopedic surgeon in private practice.

References

External links 
Official Website
decathlon team

1969 births
Living people
German decathletes
Athletes (track and field) at the 1996 Summer Olympics
German orthopedic surgeons
Olympic athletes of Germany
Sportspeople from Gelsenkirchen